L'Ambassadeur Bernard Leclerc is the Special Envoy to the State of Israel and to the Russian Federation for the Republic of Vanuatu. He has previously worked as a bank director and as an advisor to the Central African Republic.

Early life
Born in France, Leclerc studied political sciences in California, United States. He has then studied economics, social sciences and European affairs (He graduated with a Master's degree in European projects), at the University of Rouen and Caen. He has also taught tax policy and customs law at the University of Bangui. His Excellency is also a former student of the National Treasury School in Paris.

Diplomatic career

Following a long career in the banking industry (mostly as a bank director), he entered diplomatic service, first as a close Adviser to Albert Mberio, Minister of Education of the Central African Republic, in charge of international relations and partnerships. He then became a special adviser to the Central African Republic President Ange-Félix Patassé.

After the accession to the power of President François Bozizé, he became Ambassador and Adviser to the Presidency. He was then appointed Ambassador Extraordinary and Plenipotentiary and delivered his credentials to the President of the Republic of Hungary, Ferenc MADL, on 25 May 2005.

Appointed by the Council of Ministers on the proposal of Hon. Marc Ati Minister of Foreign Affairs  Special Envoy of the Republic of Vanuatu (ex New Hebrides), which is part of the Commonwealth, to the State of Israel and also Special Envoy to the Russian Federation with prerogatives and powers of Head of Mission.
 
Mr Leclerc represented his Head of State at the funeral of Pope John Paul II. 

He speaks English and French fluently and is a certified jet pilot.

See also 
Foreign relations of Vanuatu
Russia–Vanuatu relations

References 

Year of birth missing (living people)
Living people
Ambassadors of the Central African Republic to Hungary
Central African Republic diplomats
Academic staff of the University of Bangui
Central African Republic people of French descent